Horsfieldia kingii is a dioecious tree of the family Myristicaceae. It grows up to 20 m tall and has large seeds that are dispersed by frugivores such as hornbills and imperial pigeons. The fruiting period is from February to May. The fruit is an arillate capsule and is bi-coloured.

The plant is referred to as ramtamul in Assamese language and is sometimes used as a substitute for betelnut.  However, they could be mildly intoxicating to humans. The leaves form a part of the diet of the endangered capped langur.

References

kingii
Trees of China
Flora of the Indian subcontinent
Trees of Thailand